Frank Kenneth Sansom (April 2, 1927 – October 8, 2012) was an American actor. Among his best known roles, Sansom voiced Rabbit in animated television series, television specials, and films for Disney's Winnie the Pooh franchise from 1988 to 2010.

Early life
Sansom was born on April 2, 1927, in Salt Lake City, Utah. He enlisted in the United States Navy soon after graduating from East High School in Salt Lake City in 1944.

Sansom enrolled at the University of Utah following World War II, but did not complete his studies at that university. He transferred to Brigham Young University, where he received a bachelor's degree in radio broadcasting in 1949.

He was recalled by the U.S. Navy for service during the Korean War. He served as a member of the United Service Organizations, providing entertainment to American troops while in Korea.

Career
Sansom started his career in 1957 with a radio show in Los Angeles called Sansom and Then Some. He began acting in early 1968 when he moved to Los Angeles. His first role was in an episode of Mayberry R.F.D., a continuation of The Andy Griffith Show. He was best known for his role as Rabbit in the television series The New Adventures of Winnie the Pooh. He also voiced Stan, the Woozle in the series. He also voiced Rabbit in a number of TV specials and movies of Winnie the Pooh, replacing Rabbit’s original voice actor Junius Matthews following his death in 1978.

In an interview with ABC 4, when asked about voicing Rabbit in the upcoming Winnie the Pooh film, he stated, "I'm not sure." Tom Kenny voiced Rabbit in the movie, although Sansom claimed he was still under contract. Ken was a member of the Church of Jesus Christ of Latter-day Saints.

Personal life
Sansom married Carla Sansom in 1961, they remained married until Sansom's death. Together they have three children.

Death
Sansom died on October 8, 2012 in Holladay, Utah due to complications of a stroke at the age of 85. He resided in Sandy, Utah. His remains are buried in Wasatch Lawn Memorial Park in Millcreek, Utah. His widow Carla is buried next to him.

Filmography

Shinbone Alley (1970) as Rosie the Cat (voice)
Tales of Washington Irving (1970) as Narrator (voice)
Mayberry R.F.D. (1970–1971, TV Series) as Clarence / Ferguson
The Brady Bunch (1971, TV Series) as Stan Jacobsen
The Long Goodbye (1973) as Colony Guard
The Sting (1973) as Western Union Executive
Herbie Rides Again (1974) as Lawyer - First Team
Where Have All the People Gone? (1974) as Jack McFadden
Airport 1975 (1974) as Gary
Funny Lady (1975) as Frederick Martin (Daddy)
Charlie's Angels (1976, TV Series) as Clerk
Days of Our Lives (1976, TV Series) as Frederick Powell
The Small One (1978) as The Baker (voice) (uncredited)
Nutcracker Fantasy (1979) as Chamberlain / The Poet Wiseman (voice)
Banjo the Woodpile Cat (1979) as Banjo's Father / The Farmer (voice)
The Invisible Woman (1983, TV Movie) as Lionel Gilbert
The Littles (1983-1985, TV Series) as Dr. Hunter and Peterson
Gallavants (1984) as Thunk - Narrator (voice)
The Transformers (1984–1985, TV Series) as Hound
Starchaser: The Legend of Orin (1985) as Magreb / Tactical Robot (voice)
Murder She Wrote (1985–1986, TV Series) as Bert / Man
The Chipmunk Adventure (1987) as Inspector Jamal / Additional Voices (voice)
The Bible: The Amazing Book (1988) as Doc Dickory (voice)
The Bible: The Amazing Children (1989) as Doc Dickory (voice)
The Wizard of Oz (1990, TV series) (voice)
The New Adventures of Winnie the Pooh (1988–1991, TV Series) as Rabbit / Stan Woozle / Piglet Look-Alike / Store Clerk (voice)
TaleSpin (1 episode, 1990) as Ralph Throgmorton (voice)
The Bible: The Amazing Miracles (1991) as Doc Dickory (voice)
Boo to You Too! Winnie the Pooh (1996) as Rabbit (voice)
Pooh's Grand Adventure: The Search for Christopher Robin (1997) as Rabbit (voice)
The Magical World of Walt Disney (1998-2010) as Rabbit (voice)
My Interactive Pooh (1998, Video Game) as Rabbit (voice)
A Winnie the Pooh Thanksgiving (1998, TV special) as Rabbit (voice)
Winnie the Pooh: A Valentine for You (1999, TV special) as Rabbit (voice)
Disney Learning: Winnie the Pooh (1999, Video Game) as Rabbit (voice)
The Tigger Movie (2000) as Rabbit (voice)
Tigger's Honey Hunt (2000, Video Game) as Rabbit (voice)
The Book of Pooh (2001-2003, TV Series) as Rabbit (voice)
Party Time with Winnie the Pooh (2001, Video Game) as Rabbit (voice)
The Book of Pooh: A Story Without A Tail (2002, Video Game) as Rabbit (voice)
Winnie the Pooh: A Very Merry Pooh Year (2002) as Rabbit (voice)
Piglet's Big Movie (2003) as Rabbit (voice)
Piglet's Big Game (2003, Video Game) as Rabbit (voice)
Springtime with Roo (2004) as Rabbit (voice)
Winnie the Pooh: ABC's (2004) as Rabbit (voice)
Winnie the Pooh: 123s (2004) as Rabbit (voice)
Who Saves The Village? (2005, Video short) as Ol Blue
Winnie the Pooh's Rumbly Tumbly Adventure (2005, Video Game) as Rabbit (voice)
Pooh's Heffalump Movie (2005) as Rabbit (voice)
Pooh's Heffalump Halloween Movie (2005) as Rabbit (voice)
Kingdom Hearts II (2005, Video Game) as Rabbit (voice)
Winnie the Pooh: Wonderful Word Adventure (2006) as Rabbit (voice)
Winnie the Pooh: Shapes and Sizes (2006) as Rabbit (voice)
My Friends Tigger & Pooh (2007–2010, TV Series) as Rabbit (voice), (Final voice role)

References

External links

1927 births
2012 deaths
American Latter Day Saints
American male radio actors
American male television actors
American male video game actors
American male voice actors
Brigham Young University alumni
Male actors from Salt Lake City
People from Salt Lake County, Utah
United States Navy personnel of World War II
United States Navy personnel of the Korean War
20th-century American male actors
21st-century American male actors